David Bruce is an Australian singer, percussionist, and composer.

History
From the age of seven, David Bruce was educated as a vocalist, performing with the Sydney Children's Choir and amongst the renowned Gondwana Voices. He has become a recognisable face in Australian vocal art music, performing works, solo, on multiple occasions with the Sydney Symphony, including the expansive Journey to Horseshoe Bend by Andrew Schultz and sections of Howard Shore's score from The Lord of the Rings: The Fellowship of the Ring. He has performed solo, also, at mass televised events such as the Closing Ceremony and Grand Final of the Rugby World Cup 2003 and the Opening Ceremony of the 2006 Commonwealth Games. Most recently, Bruce has been collaborating with Sydney ambient/post-rock/Free improvisation artist Scissor Lock.

He has also appeared as a guest star on the popular Australian TV show, All Saints.

External links
 Scissor Lock
 ABC Radio National Journey To Horseshoe Bend special

Australian male singers
Living people
Year of birth missing (living people)